Nekropolis 81 is the second studio album by Nekropolis, released independently as a series of four cassette tapes in 1981. In 2013, the series was compiled and re-issued as a double LP by Vinyl On Demand, in abridged form.

Track listing

Personnel
Adapted from the Nekropolis 2 liner notes.
 Peter Frohmader – electronics, guitar, eight-string bass guitar, Rhodes piano, vibraphone, drum machine, gong, percussion, production, cover art

Release history

References

External links 
 

1981 albums
Nekropolis albums